Babereh, also known as Babertin, may refer to:
 Babereh-ye Olya
 Babereh-ye Sofla